Yousef Azizi (Bani-Torof) (born April 21, 1951 in Susangerd, Iran) is an Iranian Arab journalist and Arab nationalist living in exile in London, United Kingdom. Azizi is a former member of the Association of Iran's Writers and has translated many works from Arabic to Persian. He has adopted a second surname, Bani-Torof, to indicate his roots from the "Bani Torof" (in Arabic meaning "Children of Torof") Arab tribe.

He is an associate of the antisemitic historical revisionist writer Nasser Pourpirar, whom he has extensively quoted in his own writings.

On April 25, 2005, he was arrested at his home by security forces in connection with the Arab youth unrest in Khuzestan earlier that month and held at Evin Prison with other Iranian journalists and dissidents. He was released on June 28, 2005.

In August 2008 he was sentenced to five years in prison. While appealing the decision, he left Iran and gained political asylum in United Kingdom.

Notes

External links
Report concerning arrest from Cyrus News Agency

1951 births
Living people
Historical revisionism
Iranian activists
Ahwazi Arabs
Iranian journalists
People from Khuzestan Province